The 2019 Alberta general election was held on April 16, 2019, to elect 87 members to the 30th Alberta Legislature. In its first general election contest, the Jason Kenney-led United Conservative Party (UCP) won 54.88% of the popular vote and 63 seats, defeating incumbent Premier Rachel Notley. The governing Alberta New Democratic Party (NDP) were reduced to 24 seats and formed the Official Opposition. The United Conservative Party was formed in 2017 from a merger of the Progressive Conservative Party and the Wildrose Party after the NDP's victory in the 2015 election ended nearly 44 years of Progressive Conservative rule.

The NDP won 24 seats in total: including all but one of the seats in Edmonton (19), three seats in Calgary (Calgary-Buffalo, Calgary-McCall and Calgary-Mountain View), and the seats of Lethbridge-West and St. Albert. The UCP won the remaining 63 seats in the province. Two other parties that won seats in the 2015 election, the Alberta Party and the Alberta Liberals, failed to win any seats, making this election the first Alberta general election since 1993 where only two parties won seats.

The Election Act fixes the election date to a three-month period, between March 1 and May 31 in the fourth calendar year after the preceding election day which in this case was May 5, 2015. However, this did not affect the powers of the Lieutenant Governor to dissolve the Legislative Assembly before this period.

This election resulted in the highest voter turnout since 1982 at 68%, rising from 57% in the last general election held in 2015. It marked only the fifth change of government since Alberta became a province in 1905, and also the first time an incumbent government failed to win a second term.

Background
The 2015 Alberta general election resulted in a New Democratic majority government headed by Rachel Notley. The New Democrats surprise victory ended the 44-year government led by the Progressive Conservative Association of Alberta, becoming the fourth change in governing party in Alberta's 110 year history. The Wildrose Party formed the Official Opposition under leader Brian Jean, while the incumbent Progressive Conservatives came third place, but were left without a leader after Jim Prentice resigned as leader and disclaimed his seat. The Alberta Liberal Party elected one member with interim leader David Swann capturing his seat, while the Alberta Party elected its first candidate to the Legislature in leader Greg Clark.

Major changes in leadership of opposition parties occurred over the next four years. Former Conservative Party of Canada Member of Parliament and Minister Jason Kenney was elected in the 2017 Progressive Conservatives leadership election on a platform of uniting the right wing parties in Alberta which occurred after Wildrose members voted 95 per cent in favour of merging into the new United Conservative Party and forming the Official Opposition. Later the 2017 United Conservative Party leadership election saw Jason Kenney elected as party leader and leader of the Opposition.

The interim leader of the Alberta Liberal Party and sole Member of the Legislative Assembly declined to contest the 2017 Alberta Liberal Party leadership election, which saw David Khan elected leader of the party. The Alberta Party saw two Members of the Legislative Assembly cross the floor over the four year period. Party leader Greg Clark resigned as leader in 2017, and the 2018 Alberta Party leadership election saw former Progressive Conservative MLA and Edmonton Mayor Stephen Mandel elected as party leader.

Election finance changes
Following the NDP's election in 2015 the new government's first bill An Act to Renew Democracy in Alberta which amended the Election Finances and Contributions Disclosure Act was passed by the Legislature. The bill banned corporate and union donations to political parties, set rules for political parties accessing loans and reinforced that only Albertans are able to make political contributions. The next year the government introduced further amendments reducing political contributions from $15,000 per year to a total of $4,000 per year (inclusive of parties, constituency associations, candidates, leadership contests, and nominations). The election reforms were supported by the Wildrose opposition, but commentators pointed out the changes hurt the Progressive Conservatives which relied on large corporate donations. Reforms also limited party expenses to $2 million between the writ and when polls close, limiting candidates to $50,000 per general election and $23,000 for by-elections. Third party advertisers were limited to $150,000 during the official election period, and limited to $3,000 for supporting or opposing a candidate.

2017 electoral boundary commission
Under the Electoral Boundaries Commission Act requires that a Commission be appointed during the first session of the Legislature following every second general election. The Commission requires a non-partisan chair, two government members recommended by the Premier, and two opposition members. Due to the decision by Premier Jim Prentice to call an early election in 2015, the Commission was required to be formed before the prescribed date in time for the next election in 2019. Previous Commissions had provided for modest redistributions in favour of Alberta's cities which according to Political Scientist Roger Epp brought forward "deep rural anxieties" regarding declining population and influence in Alberta.

The Commission was provided with a mandate which kept the size of the Legislature fixed at 87 seats. The Commission was appointed, led by Justice Myra Bielby made only incremental changes adding one new seat in Calgary and Edmonton, as well as a seat in the Airdrie area. The Commission did however make significant statements on the rural-urban divide in Alberta, noting "Alberta is no longer entirely or primarily rural in nature" and a "disproportionate preservation of the rural voice" was no longer acceptable or feasible under law. While the Electoral Boundaries Commission Act permits up to four districts to be formed with a population 50 per cent lower than the average population, the Commission only recommended that two of these districts be formed.

A minority opinion was presented by Commission members appointed by the opposition, arguing that Alberta's rate of growth was a threat to "a critical part of our history, culture, and primary economic voice" which is at risk of being lost through continued redistribution.

The previous redistribution occurred in 2010 when an additional four constituencies were added, increasing the number from 83 to the present 87. Following the 2016 Canadian census the largest constituency Calgary-South East had grown to 79,034, while the smallest constituency Dunvegan-Central Peace-Notley had a population of 25,192.

Results
The United Conservative Party made a small improvement in its overall share of the popular vote compared to the combined vote of the Progressive Conservative and Wildrose parties which preceded it. The party won 63 seats. The UCP finished no lower than second place in any constituency. UCP leader Jason Kenney won re-election in his constituency.

The Alberta New Democratic Party lost about one-fifth of its vote share, although due to the considerably higher turnout compared to 2015 it actually gained votes. The NDP with 24 seats formed the opposition in the Alberta legislature. The NDP finished first or second in 85 out of 87 ridings. NDP leader and outgoing premier Rachel Notley won re-election in her constituency.

No other party elected any MLAs, with the centrist Alberta Party being the only other party to run a full slate of candidates. The Alberta Party more than quadrupled its overall popular vote, but failed to win any seats. All three Alberta Party incumbents were defeated, with former leader Greg Clark (the only MLA previously elected under the Alberta Party banner) being the only Alberta Party candidate to finish as high as second place. Current Alberta Party leader Stephen Mandel, a former mayor of Edmonton and PC cabinet minister, finished third in his own riding.

The Alberta Liberal Party finished fourth in the overall popular vote, with its vote share falling by more than three quarters. They were shut out of the legislature for the first time since 1982. Liberal Leader David Khan placed fourth in his constituency, which was formerly represented by his retiring predecessor David Swann.

A number of minor parties, including several running to the right of the UCP, contested the election, but none came close to winning any seats. The Alberta Independence Party (which fielded the most candidates after the UCP, NDP and AP) finished fifth in the overall popular vote. The Freedom Conservative Party finished sixth, although they ran fewer candidates compared to the other parties. On average, FCP candidates polled the most votes outside the three largest parties. The FCP's only incumbent (party founder and leader Derek Fildebrandt), who had been originally elected as a representative for the now defunct Wildrose Party, finished a distant third in his own riding. The Green Party of Alberta finished seventh in the overall popular vote and the Alberta Advantage Party finished eighth.

The last time only two parties took all of the seats was in 1993, and the only time before that was in 1913 after the defeat of Socialist Party MLA Charles O'Brien and before the rise of farmer and labour parties. Incumbent Independent MLA Rick Strankman – previously a UCP MLA – finished second place in his riding.

This was the first provincial election in which eligible voters could cast ballots at any advance poll in the province, not just at stations in a persons riding the program was called "Vote Anywhere" by Elections Alberta.

Notley's 24-member caucus is the largest Official Opposition caucus since the Liberals won 32 seats in 1993. The overall result for the NDP (both in total seats and share of the vote) was the second best in the party's history after its 2015 win.

Summary results

|-
!rowspan="2" colspan="2"|Party
!rowspan="2"|Leader
!rowspan="2"|Candidates
!colspan="4"|Seats
!colspan="3"|Popular vote
|-
!2015
!Dissol.
!2019
!+/-
!Votes
!%
!+/- (pp)

|align=left|Jason Kenney
|87 || ||25 ||63 ||+33  || 1,040,563 || 54.88% || +2.87

|align=left|Rachel Notley
|87 ||54 ||52||24 ||−30 || 619,921 || 32.67% || −7.95

|align=left|Stephen Mandel
|87 ||1 ||3 || – ||−1 || 172,203 ||9.08%|| +6.84

|align=left|David Khan
|51 ||1 ||1 || – ||−1 || 18,544 || 0.98% || −3.20

|align=left|Dave Bjorkman
|63 ||  || – || – || – || 13,531 || 0.71% || 

|align=left|Derek Fildebrandt
|24 || –|| 1 ||– || – || 9,945 || 0.52% || +0.52

| colspan="2" style="text-align:left;"|Independent
|25 || – || 3 || – || – || 7,740 || 0.41% || +0.01

|align=left|Cheryle Chagnon-Greyeyes
|32 ||– || –|| –|| – || 7,682 || 0.41% || −0.08

|align=left|Marilyn Burns
|28 ||  || –|| –|| – || 5,618 || 0.30% || 

|align=left|Naomi Rankin
|4 || – || –|| – || – || 302 || 0.02% || 0.00

|align=left|Jason Kenney
|1 || 9 || 1 || – || −1 || 297 || 0.02% || 

|align=left|Randy Thorsteinson
|1 ||  ||  – ||  –|| – || 79 || 0.00% || 

|align=left|Jeremy Fraser
|1 || – || – || – || – || 60 || 0.00% || −0.05

|align=left|Jason Kenney
|1 || 21 || – || – || – || 57 || 0.00% || 

| colspan="3" style="text-align:left;"| Vacant
||1 ||1 || colspan="5" 
|-
| style="text-align:left;" colspan="8"|Blank, rejected and invalid votes
|9,824 || – || –
|-
! style="text-align:left;" colspan="3"|Total
! 492 ||87 ||87 ||87 ||style="text-align:right" | – || 1,906,366 || 100.00%  ||style="text-align:right" | –
|-
| style="text-align:left;" colspan="8"|Registered voters/Turnout
|2,824,309 || 67.50% || –
|}

Synopsis of results

 = results as certified in a judicial recount
 = open seat
 = incumbents switched allegiance after 2015 election
 = UCP candidate stripped of nomination

Detailed analysis

Significant results among independent and minor party candidates
Those candidates not belonging to a major party, receiving more than 1,000 votes in the election, are listed below:

Results by region

Campaign finance
For the 2019 Alberta general election all parities cumulatively raised a total of $7.9 million and spent $11.3 million. At the constituency level, Calgary-Mountain View had the highest expenses at a total of $212,354, including four candidates which exceed $40,000. Of the 38 candidates which exceeded $45,000 in expenses, 21 were elected. Third party advertisers raised a total of $2.1 million and spent $1.9 million during the election. Unions contributed 46 per cent of the revenue for third party advertisers, corporations contributed 39 per cent, and individuals contributed 15 per cent.

Timeline

2015
May 5: The Alberta New Democratic Party (NDP) wins a majority government in the 29th Alberta General Election, defeating the long-ruling Progressive Conservative Association of Alberta (PCs) after close to 44 years in office. The Wildrose Party remains the official opposition, with the PCs dropping to third and the Alberta Liberal Party and Alberta Party winning one seat each. Outgoing Premier Jim Prentice announces his resignation as PC leader, and disclaims his victory in Calgary-Foothills, leaving the riding vacant and triggering a by-election.
May 11: Ric McIver, PC MLA-elect for Calgary-Hays and outgoing cabinet minister, is appointed interim leader of the PCs.
May 15: Elections Alberta publishes the official election results.
May 22: Deborah Drever, NDP MLA-elect for Calgary-Bow, is suspended from the NDP caucus for controversial social media posts.
May 24: Rachel Notley, NDP MLA-elect for Edmonton-Strathcona, is sworn in as Alberta's 17th Premier, along with her 11-member Cabinet.
June 1: The new MLAs are sworn in.
June 11: The first session of the 29th Alberta Legislative Assembly begins.
August 6: Premier Notley calls a by-election for Calgary-Foothills, vacated by Jim Prentice's disclamation of victory, with the vote to be held on September 3.
September 3: The Calgary-Foothills by-election is held. Wildrose candidate Prasad Panda is elected.
November 23: Manmeet Bhullar, PC MLA for Calgary-Greenway, dies in a highway crash, triggering a by-election in his riding.

2016
January 8: Deborah Drever, Independent MLA for Calgary-Bow, rejoins the NDP.
February 23: Premier Notley calls a by-election for Calgary-Greenway, vacated by Manmeet Bhullar's death, with the vote to be held on March 22.
March 22: The Calgary-Greenway by-election is held. PC candidate Prabhdeep Gill is elected.
May 27: Derek Fildebrandt, Wildrose MLA for Strathmore-Brooks, is suspended from caucus for controversies over a social media post regarding Ontario Premier Kathleen Wynne.
May 31: Derek Fildebrandt, MLA for Strathmore-Brooks, has suspension lifted by the Wildrose Party after promising to follow set conditions.
November 17: Sandra Jansen, PC MLA for Calgary-North West, joins the NDP after allegations of harassment during the PC leadership race.

2017
March 18: Jason Kenney, former federal cabinet minister, is elected PC leader on a platform of joining with the Wildrose to form a united right-of-centre party.
May 18: PC leader Jason Kenney and Wildrose leader Brian Jean announce that merger referendums will be held in their parties on July 22, 2017. If they pass, with thresholds of 50%+1 of PC members and 75% of Wildrose members, the parties will begin the process of merging into the United Conservative Party, or UCP.
May 25: The Alberta Electoral Boundaries Commission presents its interim report, proposing changes to the boundaries and names of the province's ridings for the next election.
June 4: David Khan is elected leader of the Liberal Party, becoming the first openly gay leader of a major Alberta political party. David Swann, MLA for Calgary-Mountain View, had been serving as interim leader since the resignation of Raj Sherman in January 2015.
July 22: The PC and Wildrose parties hold unity referendums on the question of merging into the United Conservative Party. Both parties approve the merger with 95% support.
July 24: The UCP legislative caucus meets for the first time and appoints Nathan Cooper, Wildrose MLA for Olds-Didsbury-Three Hills, as interim leader. Richard Starke, PC MLA for Vermilion-Lloydminster, announces that he will not join the UCP caucus, and will continue sitting as a PC until the party is formally deregistered. This did not occur prior to dissolution of the House, thus, Starke never officially became an independent MLA.
July 25: The UCP caucus is formally established in the legislature, comprising all 22 Wildrose MLAs and 7 of the 8 PC MLAs. Richard Starke continues to sit as a PC MLA.
July 27: The UCP is formally registered with Elections Alberta. The PC and Wildrose parties remain registered, but both share the UCP's leadership team.
August 15: Derek Fildebrandt, UCP MLA for Strathmore-Brooks, resigns from the UCP caucus following an expense scandal, becoming an Independent.
September 21: Rick Fraser, UCP MLA for Calgary-South East, resigns from the UCP caucus, becoming an Independent.
October 4: Karen McPherson, NDP MLA for Calgary-Mackay-Nose Hill, resigns from the NDP caucus, becoming an Independent.
October 19: The Alberta Electoral Boundaries Commission releases its final report finalizing names and boundary changes that will take effect for the next provincial election.  
October 28: Jason Kenney is elected leader of the United Conservative Party.    
October 30: Karen McPherson, Independent MLA for Calgary-Mackay-Nose Hill, joins the Alberta Party caucus. 
November 1: Dave Rodney, UCP MLA for Calgary-Lougheed, resigns as MLA, triggering a by-election in his riding. Rodney stepped down in order to allow Kenney a chance to enter the legislature.
November 16: Premier Notley calls a by-election for Calgary-Lougheed, vacated by Dave Rodney's resignation, with the vote to be held on December 14.
November 18: Greg Clark resigns as leader of the Alberta Party, triggering a leadership election for the party. Clark assumes the role of interim leader until the leadership election.
December 14: The Calgary-Lougheed by-election is held. UCP candidate and leader Jason Kenney is elected.

2018
January 9: Rick Fraser, Independent MLA for Calgary-South East, joins the Alberta Party caucus.
February 2: Don MacIntyre, UCP MLA for Innisfail-Sylvan Lake, resigns from the UCP caucus, becoming an Independent. 
February 5: Don MacIntyre, Independent MLA for Innisfail-Sylvan Lake, resigns as MLA, triggering a by-election in his riding. MacIntyre stepped down following sexual assault and sexual interference charges.
February 27: Stephen Mandel is elected leader of the Alberta Party.
March 5: Brian Jean, UCP MLA for Fort McMurray-Conklin, resigns as MLA, triggering a by-election in his riding.
June 14: Premier Notley calls by-elections for Innisfail-Sylvan Lake and Fort McMurray-Conklin, vacated by Don MacIntyre and Brian Jean's respective resignations, with the vote to be held on July 12.
July 12: In by-elections, Laila Goodridge is elected in Fort McMurray-Conklin and Devin Dreeshen is elected in Innisfail-Sylvan Lake. Both seats were retained by the UCP.
July 14: Prab Gill, UCP MLA for Calgary-Greenway, resigns from the UCP caucus, becoming an Independent.
July 20: Derek Fildebrandt, Independent MLA for Strathmore-Brooks, joins the Freedom Conservative Party of Alberta and is appointed interim leader until the leadership election.
October 20: Derek Fildebrandt is acclaimed leader of the Freedom Conservative Party of Alberta.
November 5: Robyn Luff, NDP MLA for Calgary-East, is withdrawn as the party's nominee for  the district and is removed from the NDP caucus, becoming an Independent.

2019
January 2: Stephanie McLean, NDP MLA for Calgary-Varsity, resigns her seat. As a spring general election is anticipated, no by-election is called in this riding.
January 15: Rick Strankman, UCP MLA for Drumheller-Stettler, resigns from the UCP caucus, becoming an Independent. Strankman claimed "hyper partisan self-centered politics" and the lack of grassroots voting within the party as his reason for leaving the caucus.
February 9: Alberta Party leader Stephen Mandel is declared ineligible to run by Elections Alberta because of late paperwork submission.
March 4: The ruling on Stephen Mandel's eligibility to run is reversed.
March 19: Premier Notley announced that the election would take place on April 16.
April 4: Televised Leader's Debate.
April 13: Advanced Polling ends with Elections Alberta estimation of a record 696,000 votes cast.

Opinion polling

The following is a list of scientific opinion polls of published voter intentions.

Incumbent MLAs not seeking re-election
The following MLAs have announced that they would not run in the 2019 provincial election:

Results by riding
The final list of candidates was published by Elections Alberta on March 29, 2019. The official results were published on May 14, 2019.

Party leaders are in bold. Candidate names appear as they appeared on the ballot.

† = Not seeking re-election
‡ = Running for re-election in different riding

Northern Alberta

|-
|rowspan=3 style="background:whitesmoke;"|Athabasca-Barrhead-Westlock
|rowspan=3|
|rowspan=3| Therese Taschuk4,786 – 19.5%
|rowspan=3 |
|rowspan=3|Glenn van Dijken16,822 – 68.5%
|rowspan=3|
|rowspan=3|
|rowspan=3|
|rowspan=3|Wayne Rufiange2,232 – 9.1%
|rowspan=3|
|rowspan=3|Buster Malcolm (AIP)442 – 1.8%Brad Giroux (Ind.)273 – 1.1%
||
|Glenn van DijkenBarrhead-Morinville-Westlock
|-
| colspan="2"  style="background:whitesmoke; text-align:center;"|Merged riding
|-
||
|Colin Piquette †Athabasca-Sturgeon-Redwater
|-
|rowspan=3 style="background:whitesmoke;"|Bonnyville-Cold Lake-St. Paul
|rowspan=3|
|rowspan=3|Kari Whan3,061 – 14.0%
|rowspan=3 |
|rowspan=3|David Hanson15,943 – 73.1%
|rowspan=3|
|rowspan=3|
|rowspan=3|
|rowspan=3|Glenn Andersen2,223 – 10.2%
|rowspan=3|
|rowspan=3|David Garnett-Bennett (AIP)217 – 1.0%David Inscho (AAP)207 – 0.9%Kacey L. Daniels (Ind.)162 – 0.7%
||
|Scott Cyr †Bonnyville-Cold Lake
|-
| colspan="2"  style="background:whitesmoke; text-align:center;"|Merged riding
|-
||
|David HansonLac La Biche-St. Paul-Two Hills
|-
| style="background:whitesmoke;"|Central Peace-Notley
|
|Marg McCuaig-Boyd2,794 – 19.5%
||
|Todd Loewen10,770 – 75.2%
|
|Wayne F. Meyer108 – 0.8%
|
|Travis McKim654 – 4.6%
|
|
||
|Margaret McCuaig-BoydDunvegan-Central Peace-Notley
|-
| style="background:whitesmoke;"|Fort McMurray-Lac La Biche
|
|Jane Stroud3,635 – 24.5%
||
|Laila Goodridge9,836 – 66.3%
|
|
|
|Jeff Fafard857 – 5.8%
|
|Mark Grinder (AIP)271 – 1.8%Brian Deheer (Gr.)230 – 1.6%
||
|Laila GoodridgeFort McMurray-Conklin
|-
| style="background:whitesmoke;"|Fort McMurray-Wood Buffalo
|
|Stephen Drover3,129 – 21.7%
||
|Tany Yao10,269 – 71.1%
|
|
|
|Marcus Erlandson804 – 5.6%
|
|Michael Keller (AIP)249 – 1.7%
||
|Tany Yao
|-
| style="background:whitesmoke;"|Grande Prairie
|
|Todd Russell4,361 – 21.6%
||
|Tracy Allard12,713 – 63.0%
|
|
|
|Grant Berg2,516 – 12.5%
|
|Bernard Hancock (FCP)392 – 1.9%Ray Robertson (AIP)126 – 0.6%Rony Rajput (Ind.)66 – 0.3%
||
|Todd Loewen ‡Grande Prairie-Smoky
|-
| style="background:whitesmoke;"|Grande Prairie-Wapiti
|
|Shannon Dunfield3,523 – 14.8%
||
|Travis Toews17,772 – 74.8%
|
|
|
|Jason Jones2,227 – 9.4%
|
| Terry Dueck (Ind.)222 – 0.9%
||
|Wayne Drysdale †
|-
| style="background:whitesmoke;"|Lesser Slave Lake
|
|Danielle Larivee3,676 – 36.1%
||
|Pat Rehn5,873 – 57.7%
|
|
|
|Vincent Rain381 – 3.7%
|
|Suzette Powder (AIP)251 – 2.5%
||
|Danielle Larivee
|-
| style="background:whitesmoke;"|Peace River
|
|Debbie Jabbour3,139 – 22.3%
||
|Dan Williams9,770 – 69.4%
|
|Remi J. Tardif198 – 1.4%
|
|Dakota House721 – 5.1%
|
|Connie Russell (FCP)249 – 1.8%
||
|Debbie Jabbour
|-

Edmonton
27 Edmonton constituencies
Six Central Edmonton constituencies
Seven North Edmonton constituencies
Seven South Edmonton constituencies
Seven Suburban Edmonton constituencies

Central

|-
| style="background:whitesmoke;"|Edmonton-City Centre
||
|David Shepherd13,598 – 66.0%
|
|Lily Le4,485 – 21.8%
|
|
|
|Bob Philp1,907 – 9.3%
|
|Chris Alders (Gr.)342 – 1.7%John R. Morton (AIP)169 – 0.8%Blake N. Dickson (Ind.)95 – 0.5%
||
|David ShepherdEdmonton-Centre
|-
| style="background:whitesmoke;"|Edmonton-Glenora
||
|Sarah Hoffman11,573 – 58.7%
|
|Marjorie Newman5,871 – 29.8%
|
|
|
|Glen Tickner1,985 – 10.1%
|
|Clint Kelley (AIP)298 – 1.5%
||
|Sarah Hoffman
|-
| style="background:whitesmoke;"|Edmonton-Gold Bar
||
|Marlin Schmidt14,562 – 59.5%
|
|David Dorward7,174 – 29.3%
|
|Steve Kochan315 – 1.3%
|
|Diana Ly2,008 – 8.2%
|
|Tanya Herbert (Gr.)247 – 1.0%Vincent Loyer (AIP)176 – 0.7%
||
|Marlin Schmidt
|-
| style="background:whitesmoke;"|Edmonton-Highlands-Norwood
||
|Janis Irwin9,998 – 63.4%
|
|Leila Houle4,015 – 25.5%
|
|
|
|Tish Prouse1,057 – 6.7%
|
|Taz Bouchier (Gr.)243 – 1.5%Joe Hankins (AIP)226 – 1.4%Chris Poplatek (AAP)116 – 0.7%Alex S. Boykowich (Comm.)103 – 0.7%
||
|Brian Mason †
|-
| style="background:whitesmoke;"|Edmonton-Riverview
||
|Lori Sigurdson12,234 – 59.5%
|
|Kara Barker6,508 – 29.8%
|
|Indy Randhawa299 – 1.4%
|
|Katherine O'Neill2,503 – 11.4%
|
|Corey MacFadden (AIP)190 – 0.9%Rob Bernshaw (Ind.)135 – 0.6%
||
|Lori Sigurdson
|-
| style="background:whitesmoke;"|Edmonton-Strathcona
||
|Rachel Notley14,724 – 72.1%
|
|Kulshan Gill3,481 – 17.0%
|
|Samantha Hees239 – 1.2%
|
|Prem Pal1,139 – 5.6%
|
|Gary Horan (PC)295 – 1.5%Stuart Andrews (Gr.)227 – 1.1%Ian Smythe (AIP)86 – 0.4%Don Edward Meister (AAP)62 – 0.3%Naomi Rankin (Comm.)61 – 0.3%Dale Doan (WRP)57 – 0.3%Gord McLean (Ind.)49 – 0.2% 
||
|Rachel Notley
|-

North

|-
| style="background:whitesmoke;"|Edmonton-Beverly-Clareview
||
|Deron Bilous8,834 – 50.6%
|
|David Egan6,308 – 36.2%
|
|Shadea Hussein494 – 2.8%
|
|Jeff Walters1,283 – 7.4%
|
|Paul A. Burts (AIP)240 – 1.4%Michael Hunter (Gr.)206 – 1.2%Andy Andrzej Gudanowski (Ind.)84 – 0.5%
||
|Deron Bilous
|-
| style="background:whitesmoke;"|Edmonton-Castle Downs
||
|Nicole Goehring9,445 – 45.7%
|
|Ed Ammar7,428 – 35.9%
|
|Thomas Deak291 – 1.4%
|
|Moe Rahall3,213 – 15.5%
|
|Todd Wayne (AIP)294 – 1.4%
||
|Nicole Goehring
|-
| style="background:whitesmoke;"|Edmonton-Decore
||
|Chris Nielsen8,789 – 47.5%
|
|Karen Principe7,371 – 39.9%
|
|
|
|Ali Haymour2,027 – 11.0%
|
|Virginia Bruneau (AIP)301 – 1.6%
||
|Chris Nielsen
|-
| style="background:whitesmoke;"|Edmonton-Manning
||
|Heather Sweet9,782 – 50.1%
|
|Harry Grewal7,468 – 38.2%
|
|
|
|Manwar Khan1,692 – 8.7%
|
|Adam Cory (AAP)212 – 1.1%Chris Vallee (Gr.)204 – 1.0%Terris Kolybaba (AIP)176 – 0.9%
||
|Heather Sweet
|-
| style="background:whitesmoke;"|Edmonton-McClung
||
|Lorne Dach8,073 – 43.6%
|
|Laurie Mozeson6,640 – 35.9%
|
|
|
|Stephen Mandel3,601 – 19.5%
|
|Gordon Perrott (AAP)188 – 1.0%
||
|Lorne Dach
|-
| style="background:whitesmoke;"|Edmonton-North West
||
|David Eggen9,669 – 51.7%
|
|Ali Eltayeb6,587 – 35.2%
|
|Brandon Teixeira276 – 1.5%
|
|Judy Kim-Meneen1,871 – 10.0%
|
|Tim Shanks (AIP)149 – 0.8%Luke Burns (AAP)136 – 0.7%
||
|David EggenEdmonton-Calder
|-
| style="background:whitesmoke;"|Edmonton-West Henday
||
|Jon Carson8,820 – 44.1%
|
|Nicole Williams8,302 – 41.5%
|
|Leah McRorie311 – 1.6%
|
|Winston Leung2,337 – 11.7%
|
|Dave Bjorkman (AIP)239 – 1.2%
||
|Jon CarsonEdmonton-Meadowlark
|-

South

|-
| style="background:whitesmoke;"|Edmonton-Ellerslie
||
|Rod Loyola9,717 – 50.9%
|
|Sanjay Patel7,230 – 37.9%
|
|Mike McGowan390 – 2.0%
|
|Hazelyn Williams1,273 – 6.7%
|
|Yash Sharma (AAP)263 – 1.4%Brian S. Lockyer (AIP)199 – 1.0%
||
|Rod Loyola
|-
| style="background:whitesmoke;"|Edmonton-Meadows
||
|Jasvir Deol10,231 – 49.9%
|
|Len Rhodes7,375 – 36.0%
|
|Maria Omar407 – 2.0%
|
|Amrit Matharu2,093 – 10.2%
|
|Thomas Varghese (AAP)211 – 1.0%Phil Batt (AIP)178 – 0.9%
||
|Denise Woollard †Edmonton-Mill Creek
|-
| style="background:whitesmoke;"|Edmonton-Mill Woods
||
|Christina Gray10,461 – 50.0%
|
|Heather Sworin8,008 – 38.3%
|
|Abdi Bakal572 – 2.7%
|
|Anju Sharma1,560 – 7.5%
|
|Dallas Price (AIP)254 – 1.2%Andrew J. Janewski (Comm.)69 – 0.3%
||
|Christina Gray
|-
| style="background:whitesmoke;"|Edmonton-Rutherford
||
|Richard Feehan12,154 – 54.8%
|
|Hannah Presakarchuk7,737 – 34.9%
|
|Claire Wilde375 – 1.7%
|
|Aisha Rauf1,600 – 7.2%
|
|Valerie Kennedy (Gr.)191 – 0.9%Lionel Levoir (AIP)117 – 0.5%
||
|Richard Feehan
|-
| style="background:whitesmoke;"|Edmonton-South
||
|Thomas Dang10,673 – 46.6%
|
|Tunde Obasan9,881 – 43.2%
|
|
|
|Pramod Kumar2,156 – 9.4%
|
|Ben Roach (Gr.)180 – 0.8%
||
|New District
|-
| style="background:whitesmoke;"|Edmonton-South West
|
|John Archer8,743 – 41.4%
||
|Kaycee Madu9,602 – 45.5%
|
|
|
|Mo Elsalhy2,457 – 11.6%
|
|Marilyn Burns (AAP)195 – 0.9%Rigel Vincent (Gr.)119 – 0.6%
||
|Thomas Dang ‡
|-
| style="background:whitesmoke;"|Edmonton-Whitemud
||
|Rakhi Pancholi11,373 – 49.2%
|
|Elisabeth Hughes9,120 – 39.4%
|
|
|
|Jonathan Dai2,335 – 10.1%
|
|Jason Norris (FCP)297 – 1.3%
||
|Bob Turner †
|-

Suburbs

|-
| style="background:whitesmoke;"|Fort Saskatchewan-Vegreville
|
|Jessica Littlewood7,790 – 29.4%
||
|Jackie Armstrong Homeniuk14,233 – 53.6%
|
|
|
|Marvin Olsen3,386 – 12.8%
|
|Malcolm Stinson (FCP)350 – 1.3%Rebecca Trotter (Gr.)278 – 1.0%Shane Ladouceur (AIP)261 – 1.0%Ronald Malowany (AAP)241 – 0.9%
||
|Jessica Littlewood
|-
| style="background:whitesmoke;"|Leduc-Beaumont
|
|Shaye Anderson7,251 – 28.3%
||
|Brad Rutherford14,982 – 58.4%
|
|Chris Fenske212 – 0.8%
|
|Robb Connelly2,206 – 8.6%
|
|Gil Poitras (AAP)304 – 1.2%Jeff Rout (FCP)258 – 1.0%Jenn Roach (Gr.)203 – 0.8%Kevin Dunn (AIP)165 – 0.6%Sharon Maclise (Ind.)71 – 0.3%
||
|Shaye Anderson
|-
| style="background:whitesmoke;"|Morinville-St. Albert
|
|Natalie Birnie8,908 – 33.2%
||
|Dale Nally13,435 – 50.0% (just slightly more than half)
|
|
|
|Neil Korotash3,963 – 14.8%
|
|Mike van Velzen (AIP)204 – 0.8%Cass Romyn (Gr.)198 – 0.7%Tamara Krywiak (AAP)157 – 0.6%
||
|New District
|-
| style="background:whitesmoke;"|St. Albert
||
|Marie Renaud12,336 – 46.2%
|
|Jeff Wedman10,682 – 40.0%
|
|Kevin McLean317 – 1.2%
|
|Barry Bailey2,817 – 10.6%
|
|Cameron Jefferies (Gr.)229 – 0.9%Sheldon Gron (AIP)172 – 0.6%Don Petruka (AAP)139 – 0.5%
||
|Marie Renaud
|-
| style="background:whitesmoke;"|Sherwood Park
|
|Annie McKitrick10,685 – 40.0%
||
|Jordan Walker12,119 – 45.4%
|
|
|
|Sue Timanson3,509 – 13.1%
|
|Brian Ilkuf (AIP)216 – 0.8%Chris Glassford (AAP)183 – 0.7%
||
|Annie McKitrick
|-
|rowspan=3 style="background:whitesmoke;"|Spruce Grove-Stony Plain
|rowspan=3|
|rowspan=3|Erin Babcock7,836 – 29.4%
|rowspan=3 |
|rowspan=3|Searle Turton15,843 – 59.4%
|rowspan=3|
|rowspan=3|
|rowspan=3|
|rowspan=3|Ivan G. Boles2,597 – 9.7%
|rowspan=3|
|rowspan=3|Jody Crocker (AIP)417 – 1.6%
||
|Erin BabcockStony Plain
|-
| colspan="2"  style="background:whitesmoke; text-align:center;"|Merged riding
|-
||
|Trevor Horne †Spruce Grove-St. Albert
|-
| style="background:whitesmoke;"|Strathcona-Sherwood Park
|
|Moira Váne8,695 – 32.3%
||
|Nate Glubish14,151 – 52.5%
|
|
|
|Dave Quest3,605 – 13.4%
|
|Don Melanson (AAP)147 – 0.5%Albert Aris (Gr.)142 – 0.5%Richard Scinta (AIP)141 – 0.5%Larry Maclise (Ind.)67 – 0.2%
||
|Estefania Cortes-Vargas †
|-

Central Alberta

West

|-
| style="background:whitesmoke;"|Drayton Valley-Devon
|
|Kieran Quirke4,233 – 16.6%
||
|Mark Smith18,092 – 71.1%
|
|Ronald Brochu217 – 0.9%
|
|Gail Upton1,634 – 6.4%
|
|Steve Goodman (FCP)624 – 2.5%Mark Gregor (AAP)298 – 1.2%Les Marks (AIP)233 – 0.9%Carol Nordlund Kinsey (Ind.)106 – 0.4%
||
|Mark Smith
|-
| style="background:whitesmoke;"|Innisfail-Sylvan Lake
|
|Robyn O'Brien3,453 – 13.5%
||
|Devin Dreeshen19,030 – 74.5%
|
|
|
|Danielle Klooster2,337 – 9.2%
|
|Chad Miller (FCP)359 – 1.4%Brian Vanderkley (AAP)164 – 0.6%Ed Wychopen (Ind.)106 – 0.4%Lauren Thorsteinson (Ref.)79 – 0.3%
||
|Devin Dreeshen
|-
| style="background:whitesmoke;"|Lac Ste. Anne-Parkland
|
|Oneil Carlier5,646 – 23.4%
||
|Shane Getson15,860 – 65.7%
|
|
|
|Donald Walter McCargar1,870 – 7.8%
|
|Gordon W. McMillan (AIP)413 – 1.7%Darien Masse (AAP)337 – 1.4%
||
|Oneil CarlierWhitecourt-Ste. Anne
|-
| style="background:whitesmoke;"|Red Deer-North
|
|Kim Schreiner4,873 – 23.2%
||
|Adriana LaGrange12,739 – 60.6%
|
|
|
|Paul Hardy2,769 – 13.2%
|
|Matt Chapin (FCP)389 – 1.9%Michael Neufeld (AIP)248 – 1.2%
||
|Kim Schreiner
|-
| style="background:whitesmoke;"|Red Deer-South
|
|Barb Miller6,844 – 25.5%
||
|Jason Stephan16,159 – 60.3%
|
|
|
|Ryan McDougall3,244 – 12.1%
|
|Teah-Jay Cartwright (FCP)299 – 1.1%Lori Curran (Gr.)246 – 0.9%
||
|Barb Miller
|-
| style="background:whitesmoke;"|Rimbey-Rocky Mountain House-Sundre
|
|Jeff Ible2,293 – 9.1%
||
|Jason Nixon20,579 – 81.6%
|
|
|
|Joe Anglin1,350 – 5.4%
|
|Dawn Berard (FCP)303 – 1.2%Jane Drummond (Gr.)286 – 1.1%David Rogers (AIP)185 – 0.7%Paula Lamoureux (AAP)161 – 0.6%Gordon Francey (Ind.)50 – 0.2%
||
|Jason Nixon
|-
| style="background:whitesmoke;"|West Yellowhead
|
|Paula Cackett4,912 – 20.5%
||
|Martin Long16,381 – 68.3%
|
|
|
|Kristie Gomuwka2,073 – 8.6%
|
|Paul Lupyczuk (AAP)261 – 1.1%Travis Poirier (AIP)229 – 1.0%David Pearce (Ind.)123 – 0.5%
||
|Eric Rosendahl †
|-

East

|-
| style="background:whitesmoke;"|Camrose
|
|Morgan Bamford4,387 – 18.4%
||
|Jackie Lovely15,587 – 65.3%
|
|
|
|Kevin Smook3,059 – 12.8%
|
|Wes Caldwell (FCP)387 – 1.6%Sandra Kim (AAP)173 – 0.7%Don Dubitz (AIP)158 – 0.7%Bonnie Tanton (Ind.)126 – 0.5%
||
|Wes Taylor †Battle River-Wainwright
|-
| style="background:whitesmoke;"|Drumheller-Stettler
|
|Holly Heffernan1,446 – 6.5%
||
|Nate Horner16,958 – 76.7%
|
|
|
|Mark Nikota1,461 – 6.6%
|
|Rick Strankman (Ind.)1,841 – 8.3%Jason Hushagen (AIP)230 – 1.0%Greg Herzog (AAP)176 – 0.8%
||
|Rick Strankman
|-
| style="background:whitesmoke;"|Lacombe-Ponoka
|
|Doug Hart3,639 – 14.9%
||
|Ron Orr17,379 – 71.3%
|
|
|
|Myles Chykerda2,520 – 10.3%
|
|Keith Parrill (FCP)328 – 1.3%Tessa Szwagierczak (AIP)279 – 1.1%Shawn Tylke (AAP)227 – 0.9%
||
|Ron Orr
|-
| style="background:whitesmoke;"|Maskwacis-Wetaskiwin
|
|Bruce Hinkley4,737 – 23.7%
||
|Rick Wilson12,796 – 64.1%
|
|
|
|Sherry Greene1,382 – 6.9%
|
|David White (FCP)522 – 2.6%Wesley Rea (AAP)263 – 1.3%Desmond G. Bull (Gr.)256 – 1.3%
||
|Bruce HinkleyWetaskiwin-Camrose
|-
| style="background:whitesmoke;"|Vermilion-Lloydminster-Wainwright
|
|Ryan Clarke2,490 – 9.9%
||
|Garth Rowswell19,768 – 78.8%
|
|
|
|Craig G. Peterson1,615 – 6.4%
|
|Jim McKinnon (FCP)898 – 3.6%Kelly Zeleny (AAP)170 – 0.7%Robert McFadzean (Ind.)133 – 0.5%
||
|Richard Starke †Vermilion-Lloydminster
|-

Calgary

Central

|-
| style="background:whitesmoke;"|Calgary-Buffalo
||
|Joe Ceci11,292 – 48.9%
|
|Tom Olsen9,050 – 39.2%
|
|Jennifer Khan590 – 2.6%
|
|Omar Masood1,597 – 6.9%
|
|Heather Morigeau (Gr.)436 – 1.9%Cody Hetherington (AIP)147 – 0.6%
||
|Kathleen Ganley ‡
|-
| style="background:whitesmoke;"|Calgary-Currie
|
|Brian Malkinson9,769 – 42.9%
||
|Nicholas Milliken9,960 – 43.7%
|
|Joshua Codd491 – 2.2%
|
|Lindsay Luhnau2,512 – 11.0%
|
|Lucas C. Hernandez (Pro-Life)60 – 0.3%
||
|Brian Malkinson
|-
| style="background:whitesmoke;"|Calgary-Elbow
|
|Janet Eremenko5,796 – 23.5%
||
|Doug Schweitzer10,951 – 44.3%
|
|Robin MacKintosh275 – 1.1%
|
|Greg Clark7,542 – 30.5%
|
|Quinn Rupert (Gr.)132 – 0.5%
||
|Greg Clark
|-
| style="background:whitesmoke;"|Calgary-Klein
|
|Craig Coolahan8,776 – 39.9%
||
|Jeremy Nixon10,473 – 47.6%
|
|Michael J. Macdonald396 – 1.8%
|
|Kara Levis1,842 – 8.4%
|
|Janine St. Jean (Gr.)294 – 1.3%CW Alexander (AIP)214 – 1.0%
||
|Craig Coolahan
|-
| style="background:whitesmoke;"|Calgary-Mountain View
||
|Kathleen T. Ganley12,526 – 47.3%
|
|Jeremy Wong9,708 – 36.7%
|
|David Khan1,474 – 5.6%
|
|Angela Kokott2,345 – 8.9%
|
|Thana Boonlert (Gr.)315 – 1.2%Monica Friesz (AIP)102 – 0.4%
||
|David Swann †
|-
| style="background:whitesmoke;"|Calgary-Varsity
|
|Anne McGrath10,215 – 43.4%
||
|Jason Copping10,853 – 46.2%
|
|Ryan Campbell383 – 1.6%
|
|Beth Barberree1,687 – 7.2%
|
|Cheryle Chagnon-Greyeyes (Gr.)274 – 1.2%Chris McAndrew (AIP)101 – 0.4%
||
|Vacant
|-

East

|-
| style="background:whitesmoke;"|Calgary-Cross
|
|Ricardo Miranda6,135 – 37.4%
||
|Mickey Amery8,907 – 54.3%
|
|Naser Kukhun410 – 2.5%
|
|Braham Luddu962 – 5.9%
|
|
||
|Ricardo Miranda
|-
| style="background:whitesmoke;"|Calgary-East
|
|Cesar Cala4,867 – 32.2%
||
|Peter Singh7,520 – 49.7%
|
|Michelle Robinson439 – 2.9%
|
|Gar Gar1,879 – 12.4%
|
|William Carnegie (Gr.)351 – 2.3%Jonathan Trautman (Comm.)69 – 0.5%
||
|Robyn Luff †
|-
| style="background:whitesmoke;"|Calgary-Falconridge
|
|Parmeet Singh Boparai6,662 – 44.9%
||
|Devinder Toor6,753 – 45.6%
|
|Deepak Sharma561 – 3.8%
|
|Jasbir Singh Dhari849 – 5.7%
|
|
||
|Prab Gill †Calgary-Greenway
|-
| style="background:whitesmoke;"|Calgary-McCall
||
|Irfan Sabir6,567 – 51.7%
|
|Jasraj Singh Hallan4,851 – 38.2%
|
|Faiza Ali Abdi281 – 2.2%
|
|Avinash Singh Khangura636 – 5.0%
|
|Janice Fraser (Gr.)218 – 1.7%Don Edmonstone (AIP)84 – 0.7%Larry Smith (AAP)60 – 0.5%
||
|Irfan Sabir
|-
| style="background:whitesmoke;"|Calgary-North East
|
|Gurbachan Brar6,046 – 35.6%
||
|Rajan Sawhney8,376 – 49.3%
|
|Gul Khan761 – 4.5%
|
|Nate Pike1,791 – 10.6%
|
|
||
|New District
|-
| style="background:whitesmoke;"|Calgary-Peigan
|
|Joe Pimlott6,527 – 29.2%
||
|Tanya Fir13,353 – 59.8%
|
|Jaro Giesbrecht425 – 1.9%
|
|Ronald Reinhold1,534 – 6.9%
|
|Sheyne Espey (FCP)299 – 1.3%Will Hatch (AIP)180 – 0.8%
||
|Joe Ceci ‡Calgary-Fort
|-

Northwest

|-
| style="background:whitesmoke;"|Calgary-Beddington
|
|Amanda Chapman7,818 – 35.7%
||
|Josephine Pon11,625 – 53.1%
|
|Chandan Tadavalkar370 – 1.7%
|
|Carol-Lynn Darch1,799 – 8.2%
|
|Tom Grbich (AIP)161 – 0.7%Alexander Dea (Ind.)117 – 0.5%
||
|Karen McPherson †Calgary-Mackay-Nose Hill
|-
| style="background:whitesmoke;"|Calgary-Bow
|
|Deborah Drever8,548 – 34.2%
||
|Demetrios Nicolaides13,987 – 55.9%
|
|Daniel Ejumabone320 – 1.3%
|
|Paul Godard1,774 – 7.1%
|
|Marion Westoll (Gr.)233 – 0.9%Regina Shakirova (FCP)161 – 0.6%
||
|Deborah Drever
|-
| style="background:whitesmoke;"|Calgary-Edgemont
|
|Julia Hayter8,570 – 34.0%
||
|Prasad Panda13,308 – 52.8%
|
|Graeme Maitland305 – 1.2%
|
|Joanne Gui2,740 – 10.9%
|
|Carl Svoboda (Gr.)155 – 0.6%Tomasz Kochanowicz (AIP)106 – 0.4%
||
|Michael Connolly †Calgary-Hawkwood
|-
| style="background:whitesmoke;"|Calgary-Foothills
|
|Sameena Arif6,985 – 32.4%
||
|Jason Luan12,277 – 57.0%
|
|Andrea Joyce379 – 1.8%
|
|Jennifer Wyness1,680 – 7.8%
|
|Kari Pomerleau (FCP)142 – 0.7%Kyle Miller (AIP)80 – 0.4%
||
|Prasad Panda ‡
|-
| style="background:whitesmoke;"|Calgary-North
|
|Kelly Mandryk4,731 – 31.1%
||
|Muhammad Yaseen8,409 – 55.2%
|
|Saliha Haq365 – 2.4%
|
|Gary Arora1,591 – 10.5%
|
|Brad Hopkins (AIP)128 – 0.8%
||
|Jamie Kleinsteuber †Calgary-Northern Hills
|-
| style="background:whitesmoke;"|Calgary-North West
|
|Hafeez Chishti7,611 – 31.8%
||
|Sonya Savage13,565 – 56.7%
|
|Prerna Mahtani258 – 1.1%
|
|Andrew Bradley2,171 – 9.1%
|
|Cam Khan (FCP)262 – 1.1%Roberta McDonald (Ind.)69 – 0.3%
||
|Sandra Jansen †
|-
| style="background:whitesmoke;"|Calgary-West
|
|Gulshan Akter5,769 – 25.5%
||
|Mike Ellis14,978 – 66.1%
|
|Yasna Oluic-Kovacevic309 – 1.4%
|
|Frank Penkala1,595 – 7.0%
|
|
||
|Mike Ellis
|-

South

|-
| style="background:whitesmoke;"|Calgary-Acadia
|
|Kate Andrews8,049 – 34.6%
||
|Tyler Shandro12,615 – 54.3%
|
|Lorrisa Good350 – 1.5%
|
|Lana Bentley1,728 – 7.4%
|
|Patrick Reilly (AIP)245 – 1.1%Amanda Bishop (Gr.)243 – 1.0%
||
|Brandy Payne †
|-
| style="background:whitesmoke;"|Calgary-Fish Creek
|
|Rebecca Bounsall7,476 – 28.8%
||
|Richard Gotfried15,975 – 61.5%
|
|John Roggeveen359 – 1.4%
|
|Robert Tremblay1,699 – 6.5%
|
|Taylor Stasila (Gr.)231 – 0.9%Tomas Manasek (AIP)226 – 0.9%
||
|Richard Gotfried
|-
| style="background:whitesmoke;"|Calgary-Glenmore
|
|Jordan Stein8,739 – 32.0%
||
|Whitney Issik14,565 – 55.6%
|
|Shirley Ksienski424 – 1.6%
|
|Scott Appleby2,217 – 8.5%
|
|Allie Tulick (Gr.)311 – 1.2%Dejan Ristic (FCP)159 – 0.6%Rafael Krukowski (AIP)123 – 0.5%
||
|Anam Kazim †
|-
| style="background:whitesmoke;"|Calgary-Hays
|
|Tory Tomblin5,706 – 25.4%
||
|Richard William "Ric" McIver14,186 – 63.2%
|
|Frances Woytkiw293 – 1.3%
|
|Chris Nowell2,052 – 9.1%
|
|Kenneth Morrice (AIP)211 – 0.9%
||
|Ric McIver
|-
| style="background:whitesmoke;"|Calgary-Lougheed
|
|Julia Bietz4,334 – 24.5%
||
|Jason Kenney11,633 – 65.7%
|
|Wilson McCutchan219 – 1.2%
|
|Rachel Timmermans1,365 – 7.7%
|
|Peter de Jonk (AIP)101 – 0.6%Larry R. Heather (Ind.)55 – 0.3%
||
|Jason Kenney
|-
| style="background:whitesmoke;"|Calgary-Shaw
|
|Graham Dean Sucha5,594 – 25.6%
||
|Rebecca Schulz14,261 – 65.3%
|
|Vesna Samardzija290 – 1.3%
|
|Bronson Ha1,331 – 6.1%
|
|John Daly (Gr.)212 – 1.0%Jarek Bucholc (AIP)146 – 0.7%
||
|Graham Sucha
|-
| style="background:whitesmoke;"|Calgary-South East
|
|Heather Eddy3,983 – 19.0%
||
|Matt Jones12,860 – 61.2%
|
|Leila Keith224 – 1.1%
|
|Rick Fraser3,810 – 18.1%
|
|Richard Fontaine (AIP)134 – 0.6%
||
|Rick Fraser
|-

Suburbs

|-
| style="background:whitesmoke;"|Airdrie-Cochrane
|
|Steve Durrell7,183 – 25.2%
||
|Peter Guthrie18,777 – 66.0%
|
|
|
|Vern Raincock1,818 – 6.4%
|
|Danielle Cameron (AIP)345 – 1.2%Matthew Joseph Morrisey (FCP)331 – 1.2%
||
|New District
|-
| style="background:whitesmoke;"|Airdrie-East
|
|Roxie Baez Zamora4,960 – 19.9%
||
|Angela Pitt16,764 – 67.3%
|
|
|
|Alex Luterbach2,371 – 9.5%
|
|Rick Northey (FCP)482 – 1.9%Jeff Olson (AIP)213 – 0.9%Richard Absalom D. Herdman (Ind.)112 – 0.4%
||
|Angela PittAirdrie
|-
| style="background:whitesmoke;"|Banff-Kananaskis
|
|Cameron "Cam" Westhead8,890 – 42.0%
||
|Miranda Rosin10,859 – 51.3%
|
|Gwyneth Midgley228 – 1.1%
|
|Brenda Stanton941 – 4.4%
|
|Anita Crowshoe (AIP)154 – 0.7%Dave Phillips (Ind.)80 – 0.4%
||
|Cam WestheadBanff-Cochrane
|-
|style="background:whitesmoke;"|Chestermere-Strathmore
|
|Melissa Langmaid3,558 – 15.6%
||
|Leela Sharon Aheer15,612 – 68.5%
|
|Sharon L. Howe238 – 1.0%
|
|Jason Avramenko1,460 – 6.4%
|
|Derek Fildebrandt (FCP)1,683 – 7.4%Roger Dean Walker (AIP)136 – 0.6%Terry Nicholls (Ind.)112 – 0.5%
||
|Leela AheerChestermere-Rocky View
|-
| style="background:whitesmoke;"|Highwood
|
|Erik Overland4,453 – 17.5%
||
|R.J. Sigurdson18,635 – 73.3%
|
|
|
|Ron Kerr1,988 – 7.8%
|
|Don Irving (AIP)362 – 1.4%
||
|Wayne Anderson †
|-
| style="background:whitesmoke;"|Olds-Didsbury-Three Hills
|
|Kyle Johnston3,070 – 11.8%
||
|Nathan Cooper20,516 – 78.6%
|
|
|
|Chase Brown1,779 – 6.8%
|
|Allen MacLennan (FCP)557 – 2.1%Dave Hughes (AAP)195 – 0.7%
||
|Nathan Cooper
|-

Southern Alberta

|-
|rowspan=3 style="background:whitesmoke;"|Brooks-Medicine Hat
|rowspan=3|
|rowspan=3|Lynn MacWilliam4,012 – 17.9%
|rowspan=3 |
|rowspan=3|Michaela Glasgo13,606 – 60.7%
|rowspan=3|
|rowspan=3|Jamah Bashir Farah281 – 1.3%
|rowspan=3|
|rowspan=3|Jim Black1,554 – 6.9%
|rowspan=3|
|rowspan=3|Todd Beasley (Ind.)2,759 – 12.3%Collin Pacholek (AIP)218 – 1.0%
||
|Derek Fildebrandt ‡Strathmore-Brooks
|-
| colspan="2"  style="background:whitesmoke; text-align:center;"|Merged riding
|-
||
|Bob Wanner †Medicine Hat
|-
| style="background:whitesmoke;"|Cardston-Siksika
|
|Kirby Smith2,606 – 16.0%
||
|Joseph Schow11,980 – 73.5%
|
|Cathleen McFarland173 – 1.1%
|
|Casey Douglass589 – 3.6%
|
|Ian A. Donovan (Ind.)727 – 4.5%Jerry Gautreau (FCP)214 – 1.3%
||
|Dave Schneider †Little Bow
|-
| style="background:whitesmoke;"|Cypress-Medicine Hat
|
|Peter Mueller6,396 – 26.0%
||
|Drew Barnes16,483 – 67.1%
|
|Anwar Kamaran219 – 0.9%
|
|Collette Smithers1,122 – 4.6%
|
|Terry Blacquier (AAP)359 – 1.5%
||
|Drew Barnes
|-
| style="background:whitesmoke;"|Lethbridge-East
|
|Maria Fitzpatrick8,775 – 38.7%
||
|Nathan Neudorf11,883 – 52.4%
|
|Devon Hargreaves512 – 2.3%
|
|Ally Taylor1,054 – 4.6%
|
|John W. McCanna (AIP)453 – 2.0%
||
|Maria Fitzpatrick
|-
| style="background:whitesmoke;"|Lethbridge-West
||
|Shannon Phillips11,016 – 45.2%
| 
|Karri Flatla10,790 – 44.3%
|
|Pat Chizek460 – 1.9%
|
|Zac Rhodenizer1,763 – 7.2%
|
|Ben Maddison (AIP)332 – 1.4%
||
|Shannon Phillips
|-
| style="background:whitesmoke;"|Livingstone-Macleod
|
|Cam Gardner5,125 – 20.5%
||
|Roger Reid17,644 – 70.6%
|
|Dylin Hauser258 – 1.0%
|
|Tim Meech1,276 – 5.1%
|
|Vern Sparkes (AIP)430 – 1.7%Wendy Pergentile (Gr.)244 – 1.0%
||
|Pat Stier †
|-
| style="background:whitesmoke;"|Taber-Warner
|
|Laura Ross-Giroux2,363 – 12.9%
||
|Grant R. Hunter14,321 – 78.1%
|
|Amy Yates205 – 1.1%
|
|Jason Beekman1,443 – 7.9%
|
|
||
|Grant HunterCardston-Taber-Warner
|-

Footnotes

References

References

Opinion poll sources

Bibliography

Election related reports

External links
Elections Alberta

2019
2019 in Alberta
Alberta
April 2019 events in Canada